Following is a list of senators of Corrèze, people who have represented the department of Corrèze in the Senate of France.

Third Republic

Senators for Corrèze under the French Third Republic were:

 Joseph Brunet (1876–1885)
 Guy Lafond (Saint-Mur) (1876–1894)
 Auguste Le Cherbonnier (1885–1894)
 Léonce (Sal) (1886–1907)
 Philippe-Michel Labrousse (1894–1910)
 François Dellestable (1894–1921)
 Hippolyte Rouby (1907–1920)
 Étienne Bussière (1911–1921)
 Henry de Jouvenel (1921–1935)
 Joseph Faure (1921–1939)
 François Labrousse (1921–1941)
 Henri Queuille (1935–1945)
 Jacques (Chammard) (1939–1945)

Fourth Republic

Senators for Corrèze under the French Fourth Republic were:

 Maurice Rouel (1946–1948)
 Marcel Champeix (1946–1959)
 François Labrousse (1948–1951)
 Jean-Alexis Jaubert (1952–1959)

Fifth Republic 
Senators for Corrèze under the French Fifth Republic:

References

Sources

 
Lists of members of the Senate (France) by department